Masów  (German Massow) is a village in the administrative district of Gmina Łubniany, within Opole County, Opole Voivodeship, in south-western Poland.

History

References

Villages in Opole County